Ian Woods (born 7 June 1966) is a British former biathlete. He competed at the 1992 Winter Olympics and the 1994 Winter Olympics. Following his sporting career, Woods became a director at the YMCA in Windermere, and was a church pastor in Cockermouth. He also worked in consultancy for people development.

References

External links
 

1966 births
Living people
British male biathletes
Olympic biathletes of Great Britain
Biathletes at the 1992 Winter Olympics
Biathletes at the 1994 Winter Olympics
People from Dalbeattie